Jason Ngouabi Lougagui (born 16 January 2003) is a French professional footballer who plays as a defender for Championnat National club Borgo.

Club career
On 12 June 2020, Ngouabi signed his first professional contract with Caen. Ngouabi made his professional debut with Caen in a 0–0 Ligue 2 tie with FC Chambly on 19 September 2020.

On 2 February 2022, Ngouabi was loaned to Sète.

Personal life
Born in France, Ngouabi is of Republic of the Congo descent. He is a youth international for France.

References

External links
 

Profile at SMCaen.fr

2003 births
People from Sarcelles
Footballers from Val-d'Oise
French sportspeople of Republic of the Congo descent
Living people
French footballers
Association football defenders
France youth international footballers
Stade Malherbe Caen players
FC Sète 34 players
FC Bastia-Borgo players
Ligue 2 players
Championnat National players
Championnat National 2 players